The men's 3000 metres steeplechase event at the 2006 World Junior Championships in Athletics was held in Beijing, China, at Chaoyang Sports Centre on 16 and 19 August.

Medalists

Results

Final
19 August

Heats
16 August

Heat 1

Heat 2

Participation
According to an unofficial count, 34 athletes from 25 countries participated in the event.

References

3000 metres steeplechasechase
Steeplechase at the World Athletics U20 Championships